The Palogue oil field is an oil field located in Melut Basin near the settlement Palogue also known as Paloich. It was discovered in 2003 and developed by China National Petroleum Corporation. It began production in 2003 and produces oil.

Paloich Airport and Palouge Power Plant are located in the area to serve oil production needs.

In course of the South Sudanese Civil War, the oil installations at Palogue remained under government control but repeatedly came under attacks from SPLM-IO rebels loyal to Riek Machar. In course of the Pagak offensive in 2017, however, the SPLA claimed to have driven all insurgents from the oil fields and fully secured them.

References

Oil fields in South Sudan

the oil was not discovery in 2003 but was in 1984 by Cheveron company and dug in 1996